Pseudosphex leovazquezae is a moth of the subfamily Arctiinae. It was described by Pérez and Sánchez in 1986. It is found in southern Texas, Mexico and Guatemala.

Adults are on wing from September to November in Texas.

References

Pseudosphex
Moths described in 1986